Overjoyed is an album by the American art punk band Half Japanese, released on September 2, 2014, on Joyful Noise Recordings. It is their first album since Hello, released in 2001. It was produced by John Dieterich of Deerhoof.

Critical reception
According to review aggregator Metacritic, which compiles and averages reviews from well-known music critics, Overjoyed has a score of 74 out of 100, indicating generally favorable reviews. Paul McGuinness, writing in Record Collector magazine, said that "Overjoyed is a brilliant album – quite probably the best new record from a guitar band all year." Mark Deming of Allmusic gave Overjoyed four out of five stars and noted that the album is more cheerful lyrically than is typical for Half Japanese's work. Some critics gave the album mixed reviews; Adam Kivel wrote that the album's "clean production...too frequently redoubles the intentional toothlessness of the lines."

Track listing
"In Its Pull"
"Meant To Be That Way"
"Brave Enough"
"Do It Nation"
"The Time Is Now"
"Our Love"
"Shining Star"
"Each Other's Arms"
"Overjoyed and Thankful"
"We Are Sure"
"As Good Can Be"
"Tiger Eyes"

Personnel
Craig Bowen - engineer
John Dieterich - mastering, mixing
Jad Fair - cover art, group member, layout, vocals
Half Japanese - composer, primary artist
Mick Hobbs -	group member, guitar, organ (Hammond)
Jared Paolini - engineer
Gilles-Vincent Reider - drums, group member, melodica, percussion, synthesizer
John Sluggett - group member, guitar, synthesizer, composer
Jason Willett - bass guitar, group member
David Woodruff - layout

References

Half Japanese albums
2014 albums